Edendale Hospital, established in 1954, is a 1,275- bed regional and district hospital in Pietermaritzburg, KwaZulu-Natal (KZN), South Africa, operated by the KZN Department of Health.

Edendale is a teaching hospital — a satellite campus for the Nelson R. Mandela School of Medicine (since 2000). It forms part of the Pietermaritzburg Metropolitan Hospital Complex which includes Grey's Hospital.

The hospital offers services in Internal Medicine, General Surgery, Paediatrics, Orthopaedics, Obstetrics and Gynaecology, Ophthalmology, Psychiatry, and Intensive Care.  Rehabilitation services include Occupational therapy, Physiotherapy, and Speech therapy.

References

Hospital buildings completed in 1954
Hospitals in KwaZulu-Natal
Buildings and structures in Pietermaritzburg
Hospitals established in 1954
20th-century architecture in South Africa